Aminata Namasia Bazego (born March 10, 1993, in Dingila) is a politician and member of the Democratic Republic of the Congo Parliament, appointed Deputy Minister of Primary, Secondary and Technical Education since April 2021.

Biography

Education 
Aminata Namasia was born on March 10, 1993, in Dingila in the province of Bas-Uélé in the Democratic Republic of the Congo. She did her primary studies at the Golpas School Complex. In 2017, she obtained a diploma in monetary economics from the faculty of business administration and economics of the Protestant University in the Congo (UPC).

Political career 
Member of the Congolese Development Party, Aminata Namasia was elected national deputy in the constituency of Bambesa, in the province of Bas-Uélé, during the legislative elections of December 30, 2018 in the Democratic Republic of the Congo.

On December 8, 2020, following the fall of the Office of the National Assembly, in accordance with its internal regulations, the oldest deputy, accompanied by two youngest members of Parliament, took over the management of the Office, with the mission of organizing and electing a new bureau. Aminata Namasia, the youngest sitting member of the lower house of the Congolese parliament alongside Gael Bussa, is appointed quaestor of the National Assembly.

On April 12, 2021, she was appointed National Deputy Minister of Primary, Secondary and Technical Education in the Democratic Republic of the Congo under Jean-Michel Sama Lukonde's cabinet.

Aminata Namasia Foundation 
Aminata Namasia is the founder of a foundation, named after her name, and whose head office is located in the territory of Bambesa in the northeast of the Democratic Republic of the Congo. Created in 2016, the foundation's field of action is the education of young girls, the promotion of school cantina, the empowerment of women and the promotion of sport in rural areas.

See also 

 Lukonde cabinet
 Parliament of the Democratic Republic of the Congo

References 

Members of the National Assembly (Democratic Republic of the Congo)
1983 births
Living people
People from Kinshasa
People from Bas-Uélé
21st-century Democratic Republic of the Congo people